Charumitra may refer to:

 Charumitra (play), a 1940s play by Ram Kumar Verma 
 Empress Charumitra, a fictional character in the television program Chakravartin Ashoka Samrat.
 Charumitra, an alternative spelling of the historical figure Charumati

3rd-century BC Indian people